Joseph Adams may refer to:

 Joseph Adams (businessman) (1700–1737), British-born Canadian governor of the Hudson's Bay Company
 Joseph Adams (physician) (1756–1818), British physician and surgeon
 Joseph Alexander Adams (1803–1880), American engraver and electrotyper
 Joe Adams (baseball) (1877–1952), American baseball player
 Joseph Quincy Adams Jr. (1880–1946), Shakespeare scholar
 Joe Adams (actor) (1924–2018), American actor, disk jockey, businessman and manager
 Joe Adams (quarterback) (born 1958), American football player
 Joe Adams (wide receiver) (born 1989), American football player
 Joe Adams (footballer) (born 2001), Welsh footballer
 Joseph Adams (mercenary), American private investigator and mercenary
 Joe Adams (Missouri politician) (born 1944), member of the Missouri House of Representatives
 Joseph Adams (Maine politician) (1779–1850), American politician from Maine
 J. Allen Adams (1932–2017), American politician and lawyer